Ab Taruiyeh (also Romanized as Āb Tarū’īyeh; also known as Bāgh-e Nūrī-ye ‘Olyā (Persian: باغنوري عليا)) is a village in Dehaj Rural District, Dehaj District, Shahr-e Babak County, Kerman Province, Iran. At the 2006 census, its population was 25, in 5 families.

References 

Populated places in Shahr-e Babak County